Capitán de Corbeta Carlos A. Curbelo International Airport , also known by its former official name of Laguna del Sauce International Airport, and as Punta del Este International Airport, is an airport serving Punta del Este, Uruguay, located in the adjoining municipality of Maldonado. It is operated by Consorcio Aeropuertos Internacionales S.A. (CAISA).

The terminal building, designed by architect Carlos Ott, was inaugurated in 1997. Gabriel Gurméndez Armand-Ugon, former Uruguayan Minister of Transport and Public Works, has served as General Manager of the airport.

The airport is both civil and military. The National Navy of Uruguay has its main (and only) base here for the naval aviation arm.

Traffic
The airport mainly serves passengers traveling to neighbouring Punta del Este, although it also serves cities surrounding the Maldonado area.

The airport typically sees a growth in passenger numbers during the southern hemisphere summer months. Most of the passengers who fly to the airport come from Buenos Aires. International service is available from Argentina, Brazil, and Paraguay as well.

The airport can handle many types of aircraft including wide-bodies, although usually mid-size jets like the Boeing 737 and Airbus 320, and turbo-props like the ATR 42 are used in this airport.

Airlines and destinations

Statistics
The airport is currently the second busiest airport in Uruguay, both in passenger service and scheduled flights.

See also
Transport in Uruguay
List of airports in Uruguay

References

External links

Airports in Uruguay
Buildings and structures in Punta del Este
Punta del Este
Piriápolis
Carlos Ott buildings
Airports established in 1996